Acidimangrovimonas pyrenivorans is a gram-negative, aerobic, rod-shaped and non-motile species of bacteria from the genus of Acidimangrovimonas that was first isolated and described in 2018 from sediments drawn from the Pearl River.

References

Rhodobacteraceae
Bacteria described in 2018